Coogler is a surname of German origin, and an Americanized version of Kugler. Notable people with the surname include:

J. Gordon Coogler (1865–1901), American poet 
L. Scott Coogler (born 1959), American judge
Ryan Coogler (born 1986), American film director, producer and screenwriter

See also
T.S. Coogler House

References

Surnames of German origin